Acantholycosa kurchumensis is a species of wolf spiders only known from the Kurchum Mountain Range in eastern Kazakhstan.

This dark brown spider is up to 7.8 mm in length. Body and legs are covered in long hairs.

References

Lycosidae
Spiders described in 2003
Spiders of Asia